A maturity model is a framework for measuring an organization's maturity, with maturity being defined as a measurement of the ability of an organization for continuous improvement in a particular discipline (as defined in O-ISM3 ). The higher the maturity, the higher will be the chances that incidents or errors will lead to improvements either in the quality or in the use of the resources of the discipline as implemented by the organization.

Most maturity models assess qualitatively people/culture, processes/structures, and objects/technology.

Two approaches for implementing maturity models exist. With a top-down approach, such as proposed by Becker et al., a fixed number of maturity stages or levels is specified first and further corroborated with characteristics (typically in form of specific assessment items) that support the initial assumptions about how maturity evolves. When using a bottom-up approach, such as suggested by Lahrmann et al., distinct characteristics or assessment items are determined first and clustered in a second step into maturity levels to induce a more general view of the different steps of maturity evolution. Topics that are covered in maturity models include:

Analytics 
 Big data maturity model

Cybersecurity 
 Cybersecurity Maturity Model Certification (CMMC)

Enterprise architecture 
 Enterprise Architecture Capability Maturity Model (ACMM)
 Dynamic Architecture Maturity Matrix (DyAMM)

Human resources 
  People Capability Maturity Model (PCMM) (for the management of human assets)

Information security management
 Open Information Security Maturity Model (O-ISM3)

Information technology 
 CERT Resilience Management Model (capability model focused on operational resilience, i.e., cybersecurity, service continuity, IT operations)
 Capability Maturity Model (CMM, focusing on software development)
 Open Source Maturity Model (for open-source software development)
 Service Integration Maturity Model (for SOA)
 Modeling Maturity Levels (for software specification)
 Enterprise IT Performance Maturity Model
 Software Product Management Maturity Model
 The SharePoint Maturity Model
 Application Performance Management Maturity Model
 Darwin Information Typing Architecture (DITA) Maturity Model
 DevOps maturity model
 ITIL Maturity Model
 Richardson Maturity Model (for HTTP-based web services)
 ISO/IEC 15504 (for process maturity)
 MD3M (for master data management)

Knowledge management 
 Knowledge Navigator Model

Learning 
 E-learning Maturity Model (EMM)
 Mobile Learning Maturity Model

Marketing 
 Organic Search Marketing Maturity Model

PLM 
 PLM Maturity Model

Project management 
 OPM3 (Organisational Project Management Maturity Model)
 P3M3 (Portfolio, Programme and Project Management Maturity Model)

Quality management 
Quality Management Maturity Grid (QMMG)
 Quality Maturity Model
 4.0 Quality Maturity Assessment Model

Security assurance 
 Building Security In Maturity Model (BSIMM)
 Cybersecurity Capability Maturity Model (C2M2)
 Systems Security Engineering Capability Maturity Model (SSE-CMM)
 Software Assurance Maturity Model (openSAMM)

Sustainability 
 Sustainability maturity models
The maturity model concept has been applied to city planning practices, such as planning to encourage participation in cycling.

Testing 
 Testing Maturity Model (TMM) (assessing test processes in an organization)
 Test Maturity Model integration (TMMi)

Universal 
 Capability Maturity Model Integration (CMMI) 
 Performance Management Maturity Model
 Virtual Team Maturity Model (VTMM)

References

de:Reifegradmodell
eo:EMM
it:EMM